Kheyrabad-e Olya (also Romanized as Kheyrābād-e ‘Olyā) is a village in Dehaj Rural District, Dehaj District, Shahr-e Babak County, Kerman Province, Iran. At the 2006 census, its population was 146, in 20 families.

References 

Populated places in Shahr-e Babak County